George Eman Vaillant (born June 16, 1934) is an American psychiatrist and Professor at Harvard Medical School and Director of Research for the Department of Psychiatry, Brigham and Women's Hospital. Vaillant has spent his research career charting adult development and the recovery process of schizophrenia, heroin addiction, alcoholism, and personality disorder.  Through 2003, he spent 30 years as Director of the Study of Adult Development at the Harvard University Health Service.  The study has prospectively charted the lives of 724 men and women for over 60 years.

Biography
George Eman Vaillant's father, George Clapp Vaillant, committed suicide in 1945. George Eman  was traumatized by his father's death and thus had deep emotional reasons for being interested in psychiatry. He graduated from Harvard College and Harvard Medical School, did his psychiatric residency at the Massachusetts Mental Health Center and completed his psychoanalytic training at the Boston Psychoanalytic Institute. He has been a Fellow at the Center for Advanced Study in the Behavioral Sciences, is a Fellow of the American College of Psychiatrists and has been an invited speaker and consultant for seminars and workshops throughout the world.

A major focus of his work in the past has been to develop ways of studying defense mechanisms empirically; more recently, he has been interested in successful aging and human happiness.

In 2008, he took up a supervisory role for psychiatric trainees at St. Vincent's Hospital in Melbourne, Australia. In June 2009, Joshua Wolf Shenk 
published an article in the Atlantic Monthly entitled "What Makes Us Happy?" which focused on Vaillant's work in the Grant Study, a study of 268 men over many decades.

Vaillant has been married four times, once to late psychotherapist Leigh McCullough. He currently lives in California with his current wife, Diane Highumn a psychiatrist and Harvard Medical School graduate, and step-daughter, Zoe.

Awards
Vaillant has received the Foundations Fund Prize for Research in Psychiatry from the American Psychiatric Association, the Strecker Award from The Pennsylvania Hospital, the Burlingame Award from The Institute for Living, and the Jellinek Award for research on alcoholism.  In 1995 he received the research prize of the International Psychogeriatric Society.

Editorial board membership
Vaillant sits on the Honorary International Advisory Board of the Mens Sana Monographs.

He joined the board of trustees of Alcoholics Anonymous as a Class A (non-alcoholic) trustee in 1998.

Books
Vaillant, GE (1977), Adaptation to Life, Boston, MA, Little, Brown, 1977 (also Lippincott Williams & Wilkins, Hardcover, 396pp ) [also German, Korean and Chinese translations] (Reprinted with a new preface in 1995 by Harvard University Press, Cambridge, MA)
Vaillant, GE (1983), Natural History of Alcoholism, Cambridge, MA, Harvard University Press
Vaillant, GE (1992), Ego Mechanisms of Defense: A Guide for Clinicians and Researchers, Washington, DC, American Psychiatric Press
Vaillant, GE (1993), The Wisdom of the Ego, Cambridge, MA, Harvard University Press, 
Vaillant, GE (1995), The Natural History of Alcoholism Revisited, Cambridge, MA, Harvard University Press, [also (Brazilian) Portuguese translation]
Vaillant, GE (2002), Aging Well,  Boston, Little Brown, 
Vaillant, GE (2008), Spiritual Evolution: A Scientific Defense of Faith, Broadway Books, 
Vaillant, GE (2012), Triumphs of Experience: The Men of the Harvard Grant Study, Belknap Press, 
Vaillant, GE (2017), Heaven on My Mind: Using the Harvard Grant Study of Adult Development to Explore the Value of the Prospection of Life After Death, Nova Science Publishers, Inc.,

See also

 Postponement of affect
 Career consolidation
 Keeper of the Meaning

References

Further reading
"Conversation with George Vaillant." Addiction. 2005 Mar; 100 (3):274-80.
"Interview: A Doctor Speaks". AA Grapevine Magazine, May 2001, Vol. 57, No. 12.

"Vaillant on 'Spiritual Evolution'". Brief review of most recent book.
"What Makes Us Happy?". Article in the Atlantic.

1934 births
Living people
American psychiatrists
Harvard Medical School alumni
Researchers in alcohol abuse
The Harvard Lampoon alumni
Alcoholics Anonymous
Harvard College alumni
Physicians of Brigham and Women's Hospital